William Wayne Stewart (April 12, 1928 – September 25, 2013) was an American professional baseball player.

Stewart attended Michigan State University, where he played baseball.  He signed with the Philadelphia Athletics in 1949 and his professional baseball career lasted for nine seasons and 971 games, all but 51 of them in the Athletics' organization.  In his 1955 big-league trial, Stewart began the season (the A's first in Kansas City) on the varsity, and went hitless in three at bats during April.  Sent to the Triple-A Columbus Jets, Stewart hit .299 with 12 home runs in 92 games. He was recalled by Kansas City when the rosters expanded in September, and played in eight more games, three as a starting outfielder.

On September 11, 1955, in the second game of a doubleheader, Stewart started in right field and collected his only two MLB hits, a single and a double off veteran left-hander Eddie Lopat of the Baltimore Orioles.  Baltimore won, 4–2, with Lopat recording the penultimate victory of his pitching career.

References

External links
Baseball Reference.com page

1928 births
2013 deaths
Baseball players from Michigan
Buffalo Bisons (minor league) players
Charleston Senators players
Columbus Jets players
Kansas City Athletics players
Lexington A's players
Lincoln A's players
Major League Baseball outfielders
Michigan State Spartans baseball players
Michigan State University alumni
Ottawa A's players
Sportspeople from Bay City, Michigan
Salisbury A's players
Williamsport A's players